Gordon Stanley Green (born 31 May 1925) is a former Australian rules footballer who played with North Melbourne in the Victorian Football League (VFL).

Notes

External links 

Living people
1925 births
Australian rules footballers from Victoria (Australia)
North Melbourne Football Club players